Long in the tooth may refer to:

Horse teeth
Long in the Tooth (Billy Joe Shaver album)